Leucoagaricus badhamii is a species of fungus in the family Agaricaceae. The flesh of this mushroom turns blood red when cut or bruised, hence its common name of blushing dapperling. These damaged areas may eventually turn brown or black and likewise the mushroom may discolour brown or black with age. All parts of the flesh display red staining aiding in identification.

Taxonomy 
This mushroom was first described by the British mycologists Miles Joseph Berkeley and Christopher Edmund Broome in 1854 who gave it the name Agaricus badhamii. In 1943 the French mycologist Marcel Locquin moved this species to the genus Leucocoprinus and some modern sources still refer to it as Leucocoprinus badhamii however in 1951 it was reclassified as a Leucoagaricus species by the German mycologist Rolf Singer.

Etymology 
Leucoagaricus gets its name from the Greek Leucos meaning white and Latin or Greek Agaricus meaning 'of the country'. Badhamii is named for the British writer, physician, entomologist and mycologist Charles David Badham, author of the 1847 text Treatise on the Esculent Funguses of England.

Description 
Leucoagaricus badhamii is a large dapperling mushrooms with white flesh that readily stains red-brown when damaged.

Cap: 5-8cm. Starts ovate/hemispherical before flattening with a slight umbo before finally becoming slightly depressed. Whitish background with brown to black scales or speckles. Turns red when cut or bruised with damaged areas ultimately turning brown or black. Discolours brown or black with age. Stem: 8-12cm. Tapers upwards from bulbous base with a persistent but fragile annulus. Stains red-brown when touched. Gills: White, free/collared, crowded. Staining red-brown when touched. Spore print: White. Spores: ovoid, smooth, dextrinoid. 6.5-8 x 4-4.5 μm. Taste: indistinct, may turn saliva red. Smell: fruity/acidic.

Habitat and distribution 
Like other Leucoagaricus species, L. badhamii is a saprotroph, living on humus rich ground, growing in small groups in deciduous and mixed woodland and may be associated with beech trees. It may also grow on woodchips enabling it to appear outside of forest habitats. It has a widespread distribution and has been found in America, Britain, Europe and Africa but appears to be uncommon.

Similar species 
Leucoagaricus erythrophaeus exhibits similar red staining.

See also 

 List of Leucoagaricus species

References 

badhamii